A galleon was a large, multi-decked sailing ship used as armed cargo carriers primarily by European states during the age of sail.

Galleon may also refer to:
 Galleon (video game), a 2004 action-adventure game
 Galleon (band), a French dance music band
 Galleon (album)
 Manila galleons, the 17th to 19th century trade route between Manila in the Philippines and Acapulco in present-day Mexico
 Galleon Group, a hedge fund
 Gloomy Galleon, the fourth level in Donkey Kong 64
 The galleon, a fictional currency unit and gold coin in the Harry Potter novels, see Fictional universe of Harry Potter#Economy

See also 
 Galeon (disambiguation)